This article covers year-by-year releases of postage stamps issued by Australia Post from 2002 to 2018. From 2014 onwards, background information was provided behind the reasoning of issuing the stamp to the public. To mark special occasions, Australia Post occasionally releases unique and limited-time only postal stamp designs, and less frequently, specially designed postal products.

History of Australia Post stamps

Before the formation of Commonwealth of Australia on 1 January 1901, each state of Australia issued separate postage stamps through colonial mail systems. After the federation in 1901, the mail systems merged and formed the Postmaster-General's Department (PMG), whose responsibilities included the provision of postal and telegraphic services throughout Australia. Until the mid-1920s, a policy prohibited Australia Post producing stamps based on commemorative occasions. It was on 9 May 1927, the opening of the first Parliament House in Canberra that marked the creation of Australia's first commemorative stamp. From then, commemorative stamps have been produced regularly to generate public interest, and to establish an environment for collectors. Although commemorative stamps are produced in reflection of historical anniversaries or significant events at the time, the public can suggest stamp subjects to Australia Post.

Stamp releases by year
Under the Copyright law of Australia, Australia Post claims copyright ownership of Australian stamps for 50 years from publication. In 2014, Australia Post released technical and historical information on their stamp issues, on their official page. In this article, the stamps that are inside the tables are hyperlinked to their official page, where the original images can viewed from there.

2002
 Birth of Albert Namatjira
 Australian Legends: Medical Scientists
 Golden Jubilee
 Winter Olympics Gold Medallists
 Motor Racing
 Lighthouses in Australia
 Flinders - Baudin Bicentenary: joint issue with France
 International: Panoramas of Australia I
 Nature of Australia - Desert
 Waterlilies: Joint issue with Thailand
 International: Panoramas of Australia II
 International Greetings
 Bush Tucker
 The Magic Rainforest (SCM2002)
 Champions of the Turf
 Christmas

2003
 Celebration and Nation
 Australian Legends
 Fishing Australia
 Blooms - Australian Cultivars
 Australian Paintings
 Coronation - Golden Jubilee
 Art of Papunya Tula
 Genetics
 Nature of Australia - Rainforests
 150th Anniversary Murray River Shipping
 Peace and Goodwill
 High Court Centenary
 Bugs and Butterflies (SCM2003)
 Rugby World Cup
 Active with Asthma
 Christmas

2004
 Australian Legends: Dame Joan Sutherland
 Tasmania 1804-2004
 Landmark Bridges
 Celebrate (16 March 2004)
 Renewable Energy
 Royal Tour Jubilee
 Nature of Australia: Rainforest Butterflies (4 May 2004)
 Australian Innovations
 Bon Voyage
 150th Anniversary of the Eureka Stockade
 Boxing Kangaroo
 Australian Olympic Stamps 2004
 Australian Gold Medallists
 Coastlines (6 September)
 Treasures from the Archives
 150th Anniversary of Railways
 Cats and Dogs (SCM 2004)
 Australian Heroes of Grand Prix Racing
 Christmas

2005
 Australian Open 1905–2005 (11 January 2005)
 Australian Legends: Fashion Designers
 Australian Parrots
 Sports Treasures
 Marking the Occasion
 World Heritage: Australia - UK joint issue
 Creatures of the Slime
 Centenary of Rotary International
 150th Anniversary of the First Australian Coin
 Queen's Birthday
 Bush Wildlife
 Australian Wildflowers
 Australian Wine
 Australian Native Trees
 Treasures from the Archives
 Down on the Farm (SCM2005)
 Queen's Baton Relay PNC (28 October 2005)
Christmas Island – Christmas 2005

2006
 Australia Post Australian Legend 2006 – Barry Humphries
 Roses
 Australian Native Wildlife
 Australian Wildflowers
Torino 2006 Winter Olympics – Dale Begg-Smith
 Australian Native Wildlife
 Queen's Birthday
 Greetings From Australia
 Lighthouses of the 20th Century
 Soccer in Australia
 Postie Kate
 Whales Down Under
 Extreme Sports
 Driving Through The Years
 Australian Rock Posters
 Dangerous Australians
 Fish of the Australian Antarctic Territory - Janet Matthews
Cocos (Keeling) Islands – Coral Reefs
 Christmas Island – Heritage Buildings
 Christmas Island – Lunar New Year 2006

2007

January—March

2007: April–June
Topics used for 2007 stamp designs
Events
 2007 Australian Open
 2007 World Police and Fire Games
 2007 Stawell Gift

People
 Rod Laver

Films
 Harry Potter and the Order of the Phoenix

2008
 Love Blooms
 Australian Legends of Philanthropy
 Organ and Tissue Donation
 Centenary of Scouting in Australia
 Gorgeous Australia
 Gorgeous Australia
 World Youth Day 2008
 Centenary of Rugby League
 Heavy Haulers
 Anzac Day – Lest We Forget
 Queen's Birthday
 Centenary of Rugby League
 Queen's Birthday
 Up, Up and Away
 Working Dogs
 Beijing 2008
 Living Green
 100 Years of Quarantine
 150 Years of Australian Football
 Aviation
 Waterfalls Australia
 Tourist Precincts
 For Every Occasion
 Mega Fauna
 Christmas
 Favourite Australian Films

2009
 Christmas Island Lunar New Year - Year of the Ox (8 January 2009)
 Australian Antarctic Territory: South Magnetic Pole 1909-2009 (8 January 2009)
 2009 Australian Legends (22 January 2009)
 With Love (3 February 2009)
 Inventive Australia (19 February 2009)
 Australian Antarctic Territory: Poles and Glaciers (4 March 2009)
 Earth Hour (11 March 2009)
Australia Post - 200 Years (25 March 2009)
 Indigenous Culture (1 April 2009)
 Queens Birthday (15 April 2009)
 Cocos (Keeling) Islands - 400 Years (21 April 2009)
 Not Just Desserts (15 May 2009)
 World Wildlife Fund:  Dolphins of the Australian Coastline (26 May 2009)
Queensland 150 Years (9 June 2009)
 Australia's Favourite Stamps (26 June 2009)
 Australian Bush Babies - International Stamps (1 July 2009)
 Australian Parks and Gardens (14 July 2009)
 Micro Monsters (28 July 2009)
 Species at Risk - Joint Territories (4 August 2009)
 Corrugated Landscapes (11 August 2009)
 Stargazing: The Southern Skies (25 August 2009)
 Australian Songbirds (9 September 2009)
 Classic Toys (25 September 2009)
 Lets Get Active! Stamp Collecting Month 2009 (6 October 2009)
 Australia Post - 200 Years (Part III) - Everyday People (13 October 2009)
 Christmas Island Christmas (2 November 2009)
 Merry Christmas (2 November 2009)
 Christmas 2009 (2 November 2009)

2010
 Christmas Island Lunar New Year - Year of the Tiger (12 January 2010)
 Australian Legends (21 January 2010)
 2010 Winter Olympic Games Vancouver (12–28 February 2010)
 A Bicentenary: Governor Lachlan Macquarie (16 February 2010)
 Australian Commonwealth Coinage 1910-2010 (23 February 2010)
 Centenary of Powered Flight (9 March 2010)
 Come to the Show (23 March 2010)
 Queens Birthday (6 April 2010)
 Kokoda (20 April 2010)
 Colonial Heritage: Empire (7 May 2010)
 Great Australian Railway Journeys (7 May 2010)
 Shanghai World Expo 2010 (18 May 2010)
 Australian World Heritage Sites (25 May 2010)
 Emergency Services (13 July 2010)
 Flowers of Cocos (Keeling) Islands (22 June 2010)
 Australian Antarctic Territory - Macquarie Island (22 June 2010)
 Adopted and Adored (29 June 2010)
 Emergency Services (13 July 2010)
 For Special Occasions (19 July 2010)
 The Australian Tax Office Centenary (27 July 2010)
 Burke & Wills expedition (3 August 2010)
 Christmas Island Frigatebird (WWF) (17 August 2010)
 Centenary of Girl Guides (31 August 2010)
 National Service Memorial (8 November 2010)
 Flowers of Cocos (Keeling) Islands (15 September 2010)
 Long Weekend (22 September 2010)
 Wildlife Caring: Rescue to Release (5 October 2010)
 Canonisation of Mary MacKillop (18 October 2010)
 Australian Antarctic Territory: Macquarie Island (26 October 2010)
 Australian Kingfishers (26 October 2010)
 Christmas Island Christmas 2010 (1 November 2010)
 150th Melbourne Cup (1 November 2010)
 Dear Santa (1 November 2010)
 Christmas 2010 (1 November 2010)

2011
 Christmas Island Lunar New Year - Rabbit (11 January 2011)
 Cocos (Keeling) Islands Boats (18 January 2011)
 Special Occasions: Love (18 January 2011)
 Australian Legends - Advancing Equality (20 January 2011)
 Premier's Flood Relief Appeal (27 January 2011)
 100 Years of Postal Stationery in Australia (8 February 2011)
 Centenary of International Women's Day (15 February 2011)
 Air Force Aviation (22 February 2011)
 Floral Festivals Australia (8 March 2011)
 Gallery Series (part 1) NGV Flowers (22 March 2011)
 Lake Eyre (4 April 2011)
 Queen's 85th Birthday (5 April 2011)
 The Royal Wedding (12 April 2011)
 "Capturing the Moment" Royal Wedding instant stamp (4 May 2011)
 Nellie Melba: (1861-1931) (10 May 2011)
 Farming Australia: Native Plants (17 May 2011)
 Christmas Island Crabs (7 June 2011)
 Australian Antarctic Territory: Icebergs (7 June 2011)
 Royal Australian Navy 1911-2011 (14 June 2011)
 Centenary of Duntroon (27 June 2011)
 Australian Bush Babies (1 July 2011)
 Anniversary of Amnesty International (5 July 2011)
 Living Australia (5 July 2011)
 Skiing Australia (19 July 2011)
 Colonial Heritage Part II - Emerging Identity (28 July 2011)
 Centenary of the Australasian Antarctic Expedition (2 August 2011)
 World Wide Fund for Nature: 50 Years (30 August 2011)
 Colours of Cocos (Keeling) Islands (6 September 2011)
 Golf (27 September 2011)
 SCM 2011 - Mythical Creatures (4 October 2011)
 CHOGM 2011 (18 October 2011)
 Joint Issue Australia-Korea (31 October 2011)
 Christmas Island Christmas (31 October 2011)
 Christmas 2011 (31 October 2011)
 Remembrance Day: 11.11.11 (2 November 2011)
 ANZUS (16 November 2011)

2012
 Lunar New Year 2012 - Year of the Dragon (10 January 2012)
 Precious Moments (17 January 2012)
 2012 Australian Legends of Football (20 January 2012)
 Technology - Then and Now (7 February 2012)
 Capital City Transport (21 February 2012)
 Australian Antarctic Territory: Phillip Law 1912-2010 (6 March 2012)
 Australian Waterbirds (6 March 2012)
 Farming Australia (20 March 2012)
 Centenary of Compulsory Enrolment to Vote (27 March 2012)
 Queen's Birthday Diamond Jubilee (3 April 2012)
 Medical Doctors (10 April 2012)
 Rising Sun Badge (17 April 2012)
 Christmas Island Ferns (1 May 2012)
 Underwater World (8 May 2012)
 Skies of Cocos (22 May 2012)
 Olympic Games - The Road to London (5 June 2012)
 Colonial Heritage - Visualising Australia (19 June 2012)
 ONJ Cancer & Wellness Centre Appeal (19 June 2012)
 Farming Australia - Part II (26 June 2012)
 Inland Explorers (3 July 2012)
 London 2012 Olympic Games (17 July 2012)
 Living Australian (24 July 2012)
 2012 Australian Gold Medallist - Women's 4 × 100 m Freestyle Relay (31 July 2012)
 Cocos (Keeling) Islands - Butterflies (2 August 2012)
 2012 Australian Gold Medallist - Tom Slingsby - Sailing Men's Laser (9 August 2012)
 2012 Australian Gold Medallist - Anna Meares - Cycling: Women's Sprint (10 August 2012)
 2012 Australian Gold Medallist - Mathew Belcher and Malcolm Page - Sailing: Men's 470 Class (13 August 2012)
 2012 Australian Gold Medallist - Men's K4 1000m - Canoe-Kayak team (13 August 2012)
 2012 Australian Gold Medallist - Nathan Outerridge and Iaine Jensen - Sailing: Men's 49er (13 August 2012)
 2012 Australian Gold Medallist - Sally Pearson - Women's 100m Hurdles (13 August 2012)
 Australian Nobel Prize Winners (28 August 2012)
 Centenary of the Australian Antarctic Expedition (4 September 2012)
 Road Trip Australia (18 September 2012)
 Wilderness Australia (25 September 2012)
 SCM 2012: Australian Zoos (28 September 2012)
 50 Years of Racing at Bathurst (2 October 2012)
 Sporting Legends: Susie O'Neill (12 October 2012)
 50th Anniversary of the Australian Ballet (16 October 2012)
 Lawn Bowls in Australia (1 November 2012)
 Christmas Island Christmas (1 November 2012)
 Christmas (1 November 2012)

2013
 Lunar New Year 2013 - Year of the Snake (8 January 2013)
 Australian Legends of Music (18 January 2013)
 Special Occasions: Greetings (5 February 2013)
 Surfing Australia (12 February 2013)
 Top Dogs (19 February 2013)
 Centenary of Canberra (5 March 2013)
 Australian Antarctic Territory: Mountains (12 March 2013)
 National Gallery of Australia: Landscapes (19 March 2013)
 Australia Bush Babies II (2 April 2013)
 Diamond Jubilee Coronations (9 April 2013)
 Australian Botanic Gardens II (23 April 2013)
 Joint Issue: Australia and Israel (10 May 2013)
 Kangaroo and Map 1913-2013 (10 May 2013)
 Black Caviar (10 May 2013)
 Australian Birds Pardalotes (11 May 2013)
 Centenary of the First Commonwealth Bank Notes (11 May 2013)
 Fishes of Christmas Island (21 May 2013)
 Cocos (Keeling) Islands 50th Anniversary of stamps (4 June 2013)
 Government House Historical Architecture (11 June 2013)
 Christmas Island Flowering Shrubs (18 June 2013)
 Road Trip Australia II (2 July 2013)
 Indigenous Leaders (9 July 2013)
 Headline news (23 July 2013)
 Cocos (Keeling) Islands Barrel Mail (6 August 2013)
 Carnivorous Plants (13 August 2013)
 Australia's Coral Reefs (20 August 2013)
 Australian Poultry Breeds (3 September 2013)
 Australian Antarctic Territory: Centenary of AAE III (10 September 2013)
 SCM: Australia's Age of Dinosaurs (24 September 2013)
 Historic Railway Stations (8 October 2013)
 Joint Issue with Germany (15 October 2013)
 Holey Dollar and Dump (22 October 2013)
 Christmas Island Christmas (1 November 2013)
 Christmas 2013 (1 November 2013)

2014

2015

2016

2017

2018

See also
 Australian Legends
 Postage stamps and postal history of Australia

References

External links
 Australia Post official stamp site
 Australian stamp issues
 Australian stamp articles
 

Postal system of Australia
Postage stamps of Australia